Hinrich Hey was a German fishing trawler that was requisitioned by the Kriegsmarine during the Second World War for use as a Vorpostenboot. She was sunk in the English Channel by British motor torpedo boats in July 1944.

Description
The engine was made by Deschimag Seebeckwerft, Wesermünde. It was rated at 127nhp. The engine powered a single screw propeller driven via a geared low pressure turbine.

History
Hinrich Hey was built as yard number 681 by Norderwerft Köser & Mayer, Hamburg for Julius H. Fock and Hans J. M. Pickenpack, Hamburg. She was launched on 6 October 1934 and completed on 8 December. The fishing boat registration HH 214 was allocated, as were the Code Letters DJNJ.

On 24 September 1939, Hinrich Hey was requisitoned by the Kriegsmarine for use as a vorpostenboot. She was allocated to 2 Vorpostenflotille as V 212 Hinrich Hey. She was redesignated V 210 Hinrich Hey on 20 October.  On 4 July 1944, she was sunk in the English Channel by the motor torpedo boats HMMTB 734, HMMTB 735, HMMTB 743 and HMMTB 748 of the Royal Navy. V 208 R. Walther Darré was also sunk in the battle. V 209 Dr. Rudolf Wahrendorff and the minesweeper  were damaged.

References

Sources

1934 ships
Ships built in Hamburg
Fishing vessels of Germany
World War II merchant ships of Germany
Auxiliary ships of the Kriegsmarine
Maritime incidents in July 1944
World War II shipwrecks in the English Channel